Maulvi Abdul Ahad Talib is an Afghan Taliban politician and commander who is currently serving as Governor of Helmand Province since 24 August 2021.

References

Living people
Year of birth missing (living people)
Taliban governors
Governors of Helmand Province